Arhopala rama, the dark Himalayan oakblue, (sometimes placed in Amblypodia) is a small butterfly found in India, Indochina, China and Japan that belongs to the lycaenids or blues family.

Range in India
The butterfly occurs in the Indian Himalayas from Kashmir to Sikkim and from Manipur to Dawnas.

Status
The species is common in the Himalayas, but not rare elsewhere.

See also
List of butterflies of India (Lycaenidae)

Cited references

References
 
 
 
 

R
Butterflies of Asia
Butterflies of Japan
Lepidoptera of Nepal
Fauna of the Himalayas
Taxa named by Vincenz Kollar